Sate Bandeng is a popular Sundanese traditional cuisine from Banten, a province near Jakarta, Indonesia.
Sate Bandeng is made of deboned milkfish (Chanos chanos) grilled in its skin on bamboo skewers over charcoal embers.

See also

 Satay
 Cakalang fufu
 Pindang
 Asam pedas

References 

Indonesian cuisine
Fish dishes
Satay
Indonesian seafood dishes